Marapana pulverata is a moth of the family Noctuidae first described by Achille Guenée in 1852. It is found in India, Sri Lanka, Thailand, Myanmar, the Andaman islands, Peninsular Malaysia, Singapore, Borneo, Sulawesi, Seram and New Guinea.

Facies is a richer brown. Costa of the hindwing is broadly dull ochreous yellow.

References

Moths of Asia
Moths described in 1852